Ramiro Benavides (born 3 January 1954) is a Guatemalan former swimmer. He competed in three events at the 1968 Summer Olympics.

References

1954 births
Living people
Guatemalan male swimmers
Olympic swimmers of Guatemala
Swimmers at the 1968 Summer Olympics
Sportspeople from Guatemala City